William Michie (24 November 1935 – 22 September 2017) was a British politician.

He was Labour Member of Parliament for Sheffield Heeley from 1983 to 2001, when he stood down. He was a member of the Socialist Campaign Group of MPs and of the Parliamentary Humanist Group. After his death the BBC described him as "a stalwart of Sheffield politics".

Early life
Michie was born in Sheffield  to  Arthur Michie, a turner, and his wife Violet. He was educated at the city's Abbeydale secondary school and Sheffield Polytechnic.

Career

Michie worked as a maintenance electrician and laboratory technician until he was made redundant in 1981, and was then unemployed until his entry to parliament in 1983. He was "a  life-long member" of the AEU. He joined the Labour Party in 1965 and in 1970 he was elected to Sheffield City Council. would serve on the council until 1984 with spells as chairman of its planning (1974-1981) and employment (1981-1983) committees. He was also Labour's chief whip and group secretary on the council for nine years. From 1974 until 1986, the duration of its existence, he also served on South Yorkshire County Council, chairing its area planning committee from 1974 until 1981.

In her obituary of Michie, Julia Langdon noted that he was "among an energetic group of young Labour activists who emerged in Sheffield in the 1970s" at a time when the area was part of what was labelled “People's Republic of South Yorkshire”. Originally intended as a criticism of the radical politics pursued by Labour in the region, it came to be embraced by Michie and others. Elected the same day as Michie was future Labour cabinet member David Blunkett. Michie himself would personally raise the red flag above Sheffield Town Hall.

Michie was elected to parliament for Sheffield Heeley at the 1983 general election, significantly bettering the result of his Labour predecessor in an election when his party struggled nationally. In 1985 he became vice-chairman of the Yorkshire group of Labour MPs and in 1987 became treasurer of the Campaign Group. According to the obituary of Michie in The Yorkshire Post opponents in  the Conservatives called him "Labour's most Left-wing politician" during his time as an MP.  Fellow Labour MP Richard Caborn, who considered Michie a "very dear friend" said that he was always associated with the left of the Labour Party and "always on the side of the minorities".

Personal life

Michie was married twice. His first marriage, which produced two sons ended in divorce in 1982. He married his second wife, Judith, in 1987 and the marriage lasted until her death in 2016. He was a supporter of Sheffield Wednesday

References

Sources

1935 births
2017 deaths
Amalgamated Engineering Union-sponsored MPs
Labour Party (UK) MPs for English constituencies
UK MPs 1983–1987
UK MPs 1987–1992
UK MPs 1992–1997
UK MPs 1997–2001
European democratic socialists
Councillors in Sheffield
People educated at Abbeydale Grange School
Trade unionists from Sheffield